GoldenTiger Productions was formed in 2007 by Maryland film writer / producer Corey Williams (born January 20, 1978). GoldenTiger Productions produced the independent feature film TORN and romantic comedy Can't Complain in 2009. In 2010 the independent feature film Razorblade City was produced followed by the film "King of Baltimore", and short films "The Charl(Y)ie Factor", "Gathering Souls" and "Early Retirement". In 2011 the suspense thriller "Senior CUT Day: The Movie" was completed. The film premiered on December 8, 2011 at the Landmark Theatre in Baltimore, Maryland.

In 2012 the documentary "Indie Film Artists: The DMV Truth" which features twenty individuals who are involved in all aspects of independent films in the Washington DC, Maryland, and Virginia (DMV) area premiered at the Landmark Theatre in Baltimore, Maryland on October 25, 2012. The documentary won best documentary at the 2013 The Hot Media International Film Festival. The documentary has been selected to the Seventh Annual Costa Rica International Film Festival in Montezuma, Costa Rica June 28–30, 2013. GoldenTiger Productions produced the feature film Roulette which was written and directed by Erik Kristopher Myers and will be distributed by R-Square Films during the Fall of 2013. Also in 2013, the comedy feature film "6 Nonsmokers" was produced.

Filmography
Asi es la vida - short film (2008): producer, writer (story)
TORN (2009): producer
Can't Complain (2009): producer, writer (story)
Razorblade City (2010): producer
King of Baltimore (2010): producer
The Charl(Y)i.e. Factor - short film (2010): producer
Gathering Souls - short film (2010): producer
Early Retirement - short film (2010): producer
Senior CUT Day: The Movie (2011): producer
Indie Film Artists: The DMV Truth (2012): director, producer, story
Roulette (2012): producer
6 Nonsmokers (2013): producer
You're Dead! (2014): producer

External links 
http://www.imdb.com/name/nm3559465/
http://www.dmvtruthindiefilmartists.com/
http://www.imdb.com/title/tt1773288/
http://www.imdb.com/title/tt1569543/
http://www.imdb.com/title/tt1547625/
http://www.imdb.com/title/tt1735477/
http://www.imdb.com/title/tt1719701/
http://www.exploreharford.com/news/3062/shot-harford/
http://www.exploreharford.com/news/3371/harford-movies/
http://www.maverickentertainment.cc/movies/820/razorblade-city
https://web.archive.org/web/20100917111050/http://www.rsquaredfilms.com/films/torn.html
http://www.allmovie.com/dvd/razorblade-city-247372
http://www.allmovie.com/work/torn-500601
https://web.archive.org/web/20110717071136/http://www.tomifilmfestival.com/2010%20TOMI%20FILM%20FESTIVAL%20WINNERS.pdf
http://www.imdb.com/title/tt1754018/
http://www.imdb.com/title/tt1754406/
http://www.imdb.com/title/tt1776904/
http://www.imdb.com/title/tt2229359/
http://www.dmvtruthindiefilmartists.com

American companies established in 2007
Film production companies of the United States